Tamara Kaliszuk (born ) is a Polish female volleyball player. She is part of the Poland women's national volleyball team. On club level she played for MKS Dąbrowa Górnicza since 2014.

Clubs
  Truso Elbląg (2002–2006)
  Gedania Gdańsk (2006–2009)
  Atom Trefl Sopot (2009–2010)
  PTPS Piła (2010–2011)
  KPS Chemik Police (2011–2012)
  Jedynka Aleksandrów Łódzki (2012–2013)
  Pałac Bydgoszcz (2013–2014)
  MKS Dąbrowa Górnicza (2014–present)

References

External links
 Profile at FIVB
 Profile at CEV
 Player profile  at Orlen Liga

1990 births
People from Elbląg
Sportspeople from Warmian-Masurian Voivodeship
Living people
Polish women's volleyball players